Sue Troyan is an American basketball coach who was the head women's basketball coach at Lehigh University, a position that she held from 1995 to 2022. Prior to coaching basketball at Lehigh, she was the college's softball coach for five years.

Player career
While attending Dickinson College, Troyan competed in both basketball and track. She was voted the basketball team's most valuable player, following her 1988 senior season, and was a three-time All-American in track.

Head coaching record

Personal life
She met her future husband Fran while finishing undergraduate studies at Dickinson, where he was enrolled in law school. When she accepted a graduate assistant's job with Lehigh's women's basketball team and pursued her MBA at the school, he worked in nearby Allentown. She was offered an assistant coach's job with the basketball team, in addition to the softball team's head coaching position. Fran became her assistant in softball and took over the head coaching job in 1995, when she became the basketball head coach. They reside in Saucon Valley, Pennsylvania, and have three children.

References

1960s births
Year of birth missing (living people)
Living people
American women's basketball coaches
Dickinson College alumni
Lehigh University alumni
Lehigh Mountain Hawks women's basketball coaches